Tamás Feczkó is a Hungarian football manager. He is the manager of Diósgyőri VTK in the Nemzeti Bajnokság I.

Managerial career

Diósgyőr
On 4 September 2019, he was appointed as the manager of the Nemzeti Bajnokság I club Diósgyőri VTK replacing the Spanish manager Fernando Fernández.

References

1977 births
Living people
Hungarian football managers
MTK Budapest FC managers
Diósgyőri VTK managers
People from Nyíregyháza
Nemzeti Bajnokság I managers
Sportspeople from Szabolcs-Szatmár-Bereg County